The 1977–78 Cincinnati Stingers season was the Stingers' third season in the World Hockey Association (WHA). The Stingers placed seventh and missed the playoffs.

Offseason

Regular season

Final standings

Game log

Player stats

Awards and records

Transactions

Draft picks
Cincinnati's draft picks at the 1977 WHA Amateur Draft.

Farm teams

See also
1977–78 WHA season

References

External links

Cincinnati Stingers seasons
Cinc
Cinc